Černý (feminine Černá) is a Czech language surname, which means "black". Like many other surnames, this originally made reference to a person's physical qualities, most likely dark hair color. Variants of the name include Cerny and feminine forms Černá in Czech, Čierna in Slovak, and Czarna in Polish.

Cognate surnames in other Slavic-speaking countries  include Čierny in Slovak, Czarny in Polish, and Chyorny (Чёрный) in Russian. There also exist Anglicised, Germanised or Polonised forms (Cherny, Tscherny, or Czerny, respectively). Related surnames include Černík, Chernenko, and Chernov.

People
Adolf Černý (1864–1952), Czech writer
Albert Černý, Czech singer and guitarist
Amanda Cerny (born 1991), American internet personality, actress, and model
Andrea Černá, Czech actress
Berthe Cerny (1868–1940), French actress
David Černý (born 1967), Czech sculptor 
Emma Černá (1937–2018), Czech actress
Ervín Černý (1913–2001), Czech scientist
Franny Černá, Czech footballer
Hana Černá (born 1974), Czech swimmer
Harald Cerny (born 1973), Austrian football player
Jakub Černý (born 1987), Czech ice hockey player
Jan Černý (1874–1959), Czechoslovakian politician
Jan Černý-Nigranus (1500–1565), Czech historian
Jana Černá, Czech dissident
Jaroslav Černý (Egyptologist) (1898–1970), Czech Egyptologist
Kamil Černý (born 1985), Czech ice hockey player
Karel Černý (art director) (1922–2014), Czech art director
Klára Černá (born 1985), Czech handball player
Ladislav Černý (1891–1975), Czech musician
Lenka Černá (born 1966), Czech handball player
Mark Cerny (born 1964), American programmer
Milan Černý (born 1988), Czech footballer
Miroslava Černá, Czech archer
Otakar Černý, Czech journalist
Petr Černý (1934–2018), Canadian mineralogist
Radek Černý (born 1974), Czech footballer
Teodor Černý (born 1957), Czech cyclist
Tomáš Černý (born 1985), Czech footballer
Václav Černý (1905–1987), Czech writer
Václav Černý (footballer) (born 1997), Czech footballer
Věnceslav Černý (1865–1936), Czech artist
Věra Černá (born 1963), Czech gymnast
Věra Černá (athlete) (1938–2008), Czech athlete
Vlastimil Černý (born 1963), Canadian swimmer
Zuzana Černá, Czech tennis player

See also
 
Czech name

References

Czech-language surnames
Slavic-language surnames